Quick Triggers is a 1928 American silent Western film directed by Ray Taylor and written by Basil Dickey and Gardner Bradford. The film stars Fred Humes, Derelys Perdue, Wilbur Mack, James Robert Chandler, Gilbert Holmes and Scotty Mattraw. The film was released on July 15, 1928, by Universal Pictures.

Cast      
 Fred Humes as Larry Day
 Derelys Perdue as Jeanne Landis
 Wilbur Mack as Jeff Thorne
 James Robert Chandler as Jake Landis
 Gilbert Holmes as Pee Wee 
 Scotty Mattraw as Scotty
 Richard L'Estrange as Lazy 
 Ben Corbett as Benny

References

External links
 

1928 films
1928 Western (genre) films
Films directed by Ray Taylor
American black-and-white films
Silent American Western (genre) films
Universal Pictures films
1920s English-language films
1920s American films